Drum's Not Dead is the third album by experimental rock band Liars, released on February 20, 2006 through Mute Records. It was recorded at the Planet Roc recording studio in Berlin and produced by Angus Andrew. The album's sound is characterized by pounding drums, highly distorted guitar drones, and falsetto vocals. Upon initial release, the album featured a DVD with three different long-form music videos of the entire album.

The album's title and several track names refer to two fictional characters—Drum and Mt. Heart Attack—who, according to the band, each represent a state of being, à la yin and yang. Drum is assertive and productive, the spirit of creative confidence. With two drum kits integral to many of these percussive, propulsive, highly rhythmic convulsions, Drum came to be acknowledged as a fourth member of the band. Conversely, Mt. Heart Attack is the reaction to Drum's action, the embodiment of stress and self-doubt. Both became key elements in the creative process.

Pitchfork ranked the album number 6 on their list of the Top 50 albums of 2006.

Track listing
 "Be Quiet Mt. Heart Attack!"  – 3:28
 "Let's Not Wrestle Mt. Heart Attack"  – 4:31
 "A Visit from Drum"  – 4:19
 "Drum Gets a Glimpse"  – 4:14
 "It Fit When I Was a Kid"  – 4:02
 "The Wrong Coat for You Mt. Heart Attack"  – 3:59
 "Hold You, Drum"  – 4:42
 "It's All Blooming Now Mt. Heart Attack"  – 3:09
 "Drum and the Uncomfortable Can"  – 4:55
 "You, Drum"  – 1:15
 "To Hold You, Drum"  – 4:04
 "The Other Side of Mt. Heart Attack"  – 4:45

DVD
 "Drum's Not Bread" (directed by Julian Gross)
 "The Helix Aspersa" (directed by Angus Andrew)
 "By Your Side" (directed by Markus Wambsganss)

References

External links
Mute.com

2006 albums
Liars (band) albums
Mute Records albums